Methylthioirontricarbonyl dimer, also known as methanethiolatoirontricarbonyl dimer, is an organometallic compound with the formula Fe2(SCH3)2(CO)6.  It is a red volatile solid that is classified as a transition metal thiolate complex.  It exists as air-stable red crystals with two isomers, where the methyl groups are either anti (isomer A) or syn (isomer B) with respect to each other.

Synthesis
It was first synthesized 1940 with the discovery of isomers in 1962. Synthesis involves treating triiron dodecacarbonyl with dimethyl disulfide:
2 Fe3(CO)12 + 3 (CH3)2S2  →  3 [Fe(CO)3SCH3]2 + 6 CO
It can be purified by recrystallization or by sublimation. The isomers can be separated by chromatography.

Structure
The methylthioirontricarbonyl dimer is a butterfly cluster compound, consisting of two iron atoms with distorted square pyramidal coordination geometry.  The geometry is octahedral if the Fe-Fe bond is included. Each iron has three terminal carbon monoxide ligands and two bridging methylthiolate ligands. The Fe-Fe distance is 2.537 Å with an average Fe-S bond length of 2.259 Å. The average Fe-S-Fe bond angle is relatively small at 68.33°. Three isomers are possible but only the diequatorial and axial-equatorial isomers are seen. The diaxial isomer is disfavored due to steric hindrance. The structurally related compound [Fe(CO)3S]2 has idealized C2v symmetry.

References 

Carbonyl complexes
Iron compounds
Thiolates